DNX or DNx may refer to:
 Intact dilation and extraction, a surgical procedure that removes an intact fetus from the uterus
 Galegu Airport, the IATA code DNX
 DNx (Digital Nonlinear Extensible) codecs
 DNxHR codec, a lossy UHDTV post-production codec
 Avid DNxHD, a lossy high-definition video post-production codec

See also 
 DNX vs. The Voice, a German duo